Justice League Unlimited is an American superhero animated television series that was produced by Warner Bros. Animation and aired on Cartoon Network. Featuring a wide array of superheroes from the DC Comics universe, and specifically based on the Justice League superhero team, it is a direct sequel to the previous Justice League animated series. Justice League Unlimited debuted on July 31, 2004, on Toonami and ended on May 13, 2006. It was also the final series set in the long-running DC animated universe, which started with Batman: The Animated Series in 1992. Unlike its predecessor's two/three-part episode format, Justice League Unlimited consists entirely of single episodes, except for the first season finale.

Series overview

Episodes

Season 1 (2004–2005)

Season 2 (2005)

Season 3 (2006)

References

Justice League Unlimited
Justice League Unlimited
Justice League Unlimited